David Spencer Bill III (born August 27, 1944) is a retired rear admiral in the United States Navy.

Biography
Bill is a native of Norfolk, Virginia. His father was a captain in the Navy, his grandfather was U.S. Representative Winder R. Harris.

Career
Bill graduated from the United States Naval Academy in 1966. He would serve aboard the  before being deployed to serve on River Boats in the Vietnam War, where he made 150 combat patrols in the Mekong Delta, was wounded in action, and received the Bronze Star for valor.

From 1981 to 1983, he was stationed in Gaeta, Italy as Flag Secretary to the United States Sixth Fleet. Later, he became an instructor at Dam Neck, followed by assignment to the Aegis Combat System Program and later as Executive Assistant to the Commander, Naval Sea Systems Command.

While in command he was responsible for the Tomahawk launches that started the war. Wisconsin fired over 350 16-inch rounds in support of allied ground forces and entrenched Iraqi troops. Several days before the start of the ground war, Wisconsin's bombardment of an Iraqi headquarters site on the Persian Gulf coast precipitated the premature destruction of numerous oil wells in Kuwait as a defensive measure against  the anticipated ground attack by coalition forces. On February 23, 1991, the Wisconsin launched a Pioneer to Failaka Island, the Iraqi Armed Forces surrendered immediately before a shot was fired after realizing the Wisconsin's Pioneer had seen them. This marked the first time enemy troops surrendered to an unmanned aircraft controlled by a ship.

Selected for Flag Rank during the first Gulf War, Admiral Bill subsequently served on the staff of the Chief of Naval Operations, was Operations Officer and then Deputy Commander Atlantic Fleet, Commander of Cruiser Destroyer Group Twelve, The USS Enterprise Battle Group, and Deputy Commander US Naval Forces Europe.

Awards he has received include a Defense Distinguished Service Medal, seven awards of the Legion of Merit, one award for combat valor, three Bronze Star Medals, the Purple Heart, the Meritorious Service Medal, the Joint Service Commendation Medal and the Combat Action Ribbon.

Retiring after over 32 years of active duty in 1998, Admiral Bill was executive director of a Development Company that created Cherokee Plantation in South Carolina and the Carnegie Abbey Club in Newport, RI. He held a chair at the Naval Postgraduate School, was executive director of the Naval Postgraduate School Foundation, was CEO of a start up technology company, CEO of the Northern California Golf Association and currently sits on several privately held company boards.

References

Living people
1944 births
United States Naval Academy alumni
Military personnel from Norfolk, Virginia
United States Navy personnel of the Vietnam War
United States Navy personnel of the Gulf War
Recipients of the Legion of Merit
United States Navy rear admirals
Recipients of the Defense Distinguished Service Medal